KMKB-LP (98.9 FM) is a radio station licensed to serve the community of Marfa, Texas. The station is owned by Casa Vida Corporation, and airs a community radio format.

The station was assigned the call sign KKLK-LP by the Federal Communications Commission on March 28, 2007. The station changed its call sign to KMKB-LP on June 23, 2017.

References

External links
 Official Website
 FCC Public Inspection File for KMKB-LP
 

MKB-LP
MKB-LP
Radio stations established in 2007
2007 establishments in Texas
Community radio stations in the United States
Presidio County, Texas